Sruti is an English language monthly magazine on the performing arts and Indian music and dance, published from Chennai, India.  

Sruti was founded in 1983 by N. Pattabhiraman, who had returned to India from a career abroad, bringing with him a focus and skill for English composition. The magazine initially had financial difficulties, with Pattabhiraman desiring to gain subscribers vice take out loans, and minimal support from corporations. The journal foundered somewhat following Pattabhiraman's death, but as of 2014 continues forward under staffers who rose to take over its leadership. The magazine was acquired by the Sanmar Group in 2006.

Journalist S. Muthiah in 2011 referred to the publication as  the country's leading journal on Indian Classical music and dance.

References

External links
 

1983 establishments in Tamil Nadu
Visual arts magazines published in India
Monthly magazines published in India
Music magazines published in India
Magazines established in 1983
Mass media in Chennai